Walter Jones (December 18, 1745December 31, 1815) was an 18th- and 19th-century politician and physician from Virginia.

Biography
Born in Williamsburg in the Colony of Virginia, Jones graduated from the College of William and Mary in 1760. He studied medicine in Edinburgh, Scotland and received a degree of Doctor of Medicine in 1770.

He returned to Northumberland County, Virginia and became physician general of the Middle Military Department in 1777. Jones was a member of the Virginia Senate from 1785 to 1787 and was a delegate to the Virginia Ratifying Convention in 1788. He was elected a Democratic-Republican to the United States House of Representatives in 1796, serving from 1797 to 1799. He returned to the state Senate in 1802 and 1803 and was elected back to the House of Representatives again in 1802, serving from 1803 to 1811.

His son and namesake, Walter Jones (1775-1861) practiced law in Washington most of his life and reportedly argued more cases before the US Supreme Court – over 300, including Mcculloch vs. Maryland - than any other attorney in American history. A close friend of James Madison, James Marshall and John Calhoun, he also held the rank of Major General of the Army, and rode at the head of the District of Columbia Militia at presidential Inaugurations. Jones was also a member of the prestigious society, Columbian Institute for the Promotion of Arts and Sciences, which counted among its members former presidents Andrew Jackson and John Quincy Adams and many prominent men of the day, including well-known representatives of the military, government service, medical and other professions. Living until the start of the Civil War, he strongly opposed Virginia’s secession.

The senior Jones died in Westmoreland County, Virginia, on December 31, 1815, and was interred there in the family cemetery at "Hayfield" near what is now Callo, Virginia.

References

External links

1745 births
1815 deaths
Delegates to the Virginia Ratifying Convention
18th-century American politicians
Members of the Virginia House of Delegates
College of William & Mary alumni
Politicians from Williamsburg, Virginia
Alumni of the University of Edinburgh
Democratic-Republican Party members of the United States House of Representatives from Virginia